The Britannica International School of Shanghai was founded in 2013 by Orbital Education headquartered near Manchester in the UK. Orbital Education is led by Kevin McNeany who previously founded Nord Anglia group. The school has a diverse population between the ages of 2-18, the campus is a safe and secure environment for all ages with a capacity for 750-800 students.

Britannica is unique in Shanghai through its British ownership, management, teaching staff and resourcing.

Leadership

The Principal is David Goodwin, who was previously Head of School in Beijing, China and in Colombo, Sri Lanka. The Founding Principal was Alun Thomas BA Dip Ed.

Facilities
There are three specialist science laboratories and ICT suites, a 300-seat theatre, music room, 2 libraries, an indoor swimming pool, sports hall and field and a spacious dining room.

Curriculum

The school delivers an enhanced version of the English National Curriculum preparing pupils for International General Certificate of Education (IGCSE) at 16. Essentially this means that in addition to the core curriculum, there is the opportunity for the pupils to study Mandarin and to learn about the Culture, History and Geography of China, and to study other modern languages. Pupils are prepared for the Cambridge University International General Certificate of Secondary Education (IGCSE) and in due course will offer year 12 and 13 students the Advanced Level General Certificate of Education (A Level)   leading to British and international university entrance.

Britannica International School, Shanghai is a Cambridge International Examination center.

Accreditations and Membership

The Britannica International School is a member of:
Council of British International Schools which promotes British International schools of global quality
Council of International Schools which helps support the continuous improvement of international education 
Britannica International School, Shanghai was the first International ASA affiliated Swim School

External links

Britannica International School Shanghai
Britannica school profile on Time Out Shanghai Family

References

Educational institutions established in 2013
British international schools in Shanghai
2013 establishments in China
Cambridge schools in China
International Baccalaureate schools in China
Private schools in Shanghai